CEA 2030 Multi-Room Audio Cabling Standard defines cabling and connectors for use in distributing analog and digital audio signals throughout a home. It is developed by the R3 Audio Systems Committee of the Consumer Electronics Association or CEA.

Scope of the standard 

The Electronic Industries Alliance or EIA now known as the Consumer Electronics Association or CEA standard ANSI/CEA-2030 as of the 3/30/2005 Publication date defines;

 Wire topologies
 Wire Gauge in American Wire Gauge or AWG
 twisted pair designation
 wire routing and control locations

See also 

 Consumer Electronics Association

References 
 https://web.archive.org/web/20071109001348/http://www.ce.org/Standards/StandardDetails.aspx?Id=2039&number=CEA-2030

Standards